Members of the New South Wales Legislative Assembly who served in the 45th parliament held their seats from 1976 to 1978. They were elected at the 1976 state election, and at by-elections. The Speaker was Laurie Kelly.

See also
First Wran ministry
Results of the 1976 New South Wales state election (Legislative Assembly)
Candidates of the 1976 New South Wales state election

References

Members of New South Wales parliaments by term
20th-century Australian politicians